Anatolian Eagle is an air force exercise hosted by the Turkish Air Force and held at 3rd Main Jet Base at Konya, Turkey. There are both national and international exercises held, the international exercises usually involving air arms of the United States, other NATO forces, and Asian countries.

History

With modernisation of infrastructure, weapons and training starting in the early 1980s, the Turkish Air Force (TAF) realised the philosophy that "no matter how modern the weapons are, it is men that use them." When the TAF gained experience during internal security operations and the Bosnia-Herzegovina and Kosovo Wars, it was decided that the TAF had reached a performance level where it could host the air forces of other countries in exercises and provide training to them. The Anatolian Eagle exercises are stated to be similar to the USA's Red Flag exercise at Nellis Air Force Base.

The TAF first sent observers to Red Flag in 1983 and participated for the first time in 1997 with six F-16s and 57 personnel. Two 'Flag' type exercises were held 1998 called Anatolian Flag at Incirlik Air Base.

The first exercise, Anatolian Eagle 01, was held by TAF Operations Command on 18–29 June 2001. As well as Turkey, the air forces of USA and Israel also participated. After the alleged coup attempt in 2016, no Anatolian Eagle exercises were held in 2017 and 2018, but they returned in 2019. In 2020 the COVID-19 pandemic meant another year without Anatilian Eagle, but since 2021 the exercise is held again.

Description
Anatolian Eagle exercises simulate a war-time environment and the difficulty level increases from easy to hard. First the training exercise is planned in the 'White Headquarters' building. Training is monitored with computers to help test knowledge, abilities and find deficiencies of the participants. The scenarios consist of a "Blue Team" which attacks tactical and strategic targets in a "Red Land" during Combined Air Operations (COMAO). The Red Land is defended by opposing combat aircraft and surface-to-air missile (SAM) systems. Statistical studies are also completed in the White Headquarters.

During the training exercise, the location, position and flight information of participating aircraft is transferred to a Command Control Centre (CCC) via an Air Combat Maneuvering Instrumentation (ACMI) system. Radar tracks and missile shots from SAM systems, AWACS aircraft, land-based radars and other anti-aircraft systems are also transferred to the CCC. Pre-flight briefings and post-flight de-briefings are carried out in the CCC where there is a briefing hall with capacity of 450 people. Sorties during the AE exercise are controlled and commanded at the MASE (Multi Aegis Site Emulator) Operation Center.

Airspace for Anatolian Eagle is 200 nm from east to west and 150 nm from north to south. The main operations airspace, also known as the Salt Area, can be used from ground level up to 50,000 feet. During the exercise, AWACS aircraft give command and control support to Blue Forces and a land-based radar gives GCI support to the Red Forces. Air-to-air refuelling tankers refuel aircraft of both forces.

SA-6, SA-8, SA-11, ZSU 23-4 and Hawk systems located at the Tersakan, Koc and Karapmar ranges are used to simulate realistic surface-to-air missile treats against exercise aircraft.

The Red Force personnel conduct their planning and briefings in the Red Building, while the national and foreign participants do the same in the Blue 1, Blue 2 and Blue 3 buildings. Red Force is restricted to their own Red Building, and nobody else can enter Red Building. Participants are housed in dormitories.

Politics

Turkey and Israel have historically had good relations, and Israel was a regular participant in Anatolian Eagle. However, three days before AE-09/3 was due to start, Turkey's ruling conservative government postponed the international part of the exercise planned with Italy, Israel, and the United States. Israeli officials were reported as saying that the decision was "sudden and unexpected" but that the Turks linked it to the involvement of the Israeli Air Force in the invasion of Gaza earlier that year. In January 2009, Turkish Prime Minister Recep Tayyip Erdoğan had criticised Israeli President Shimon Peres over the invasion; however, Turkey denied that the cancellation had been political.

Sukhoi Su-27 Flankers of the Chinese Air Force used the Konya facilities to exercise with Turkish F-4E Phantoms between 20 September and 4 October 2010. Turkey does not appear to regard these exercises as part of the official Anatolian Eagle series, despite the media reporting them as such. U.S. officials worried that the exercises would allow the Chinese access to Western technology and an understanding of NATO tactics.

List of Anatolian Eagle exercises

References 

Military exercises and wargames
Military of Turkey
Military aviation exercises